Trinity Nunatak is a large nunatak in the stream of the Mawson Glacier, about 5 nautical miles (9 km) north of the Convoy Range in Victoria Land. Mapped in 1957 by the New Zealand Northern Survey party of the Commonwealth Trans-Antarctic Expedition (1956–58), which applied the name because of its three summits.

Nunataks of Victoria Land
Scott Coast